Kaemmerer is a surname. Notable people with the surname include:

Emmy Kaemmerer (born 1890), German politician
Frederik Hendrik Kaemmerer (1839–1902), Dutch painter
Georg Heinrich Kaemmerer (1824–1875), German banker and politician

See also
Kammerer